Josef Hipp (13 February 1927 – 21 January 1959) was a German athlete. He competed in the men's discus throw and the men's decathlon at the 1952 Summer Olympics.

References

1927 births
1959 deaths
Athletes (track and field) at the 1952 Summer Olympics
German male discus throwers
German decathletes
Olympic athletes of Germany
Place of birth missing